Pepca Kardelj (née Pepca Maček; February 20, 1914 — April 15, 1990) was a Slovene Partisan and political activist. She fought as a communist partisan during World War II in Yugoslavia.

Life and career
Kardelj became a member of the League of Communists of Slovenia in 1935, and she was the only woman present at the founding congress of the League of Communists of Slovenia. In 1941 she became involved in the Yugoslav resistance movement. In December of 1941, Kardelj was captured, and she was imprisoned until the capitulation of Italy in 1943. She ultimately achieved the rank of lieutenant colonel in the Yugoslav People's Army.

Kardelj was found dead on April 15, 1990. She died under mysterious circumstances, and it has been speculated that her death may have been related to a critique she published a few weeks earlier criticizing the regime.

Kardelj was awarded the Commemorative Medal of the Partisans of 1941. She was married to Deputy Prime Minister of Yugoslavia Edvard Kardelj, and her cousin was President of the Slovenian People's Assembly Ivan Maček.

Selected awards
Order of Merit for the People, degree I (sl)
Order of Brotherhood and Unity, degrees I and II (sl)
Yugoslav Order of Bravery
Commemorative Medal of the Partisans of 1941

References

1914 births
1990 deaths
Slovene Partisans